Karumba Airport  is an airport located  north of Karumba, Queensland, Australia. The airport received $91,500 for security upgrades in 2006.

Airlines and destinations

References

Airports in Queensland
North West Queensland